Leucocytozoon andrewsi is a parasite of the genus Leucocytozoon.

Like all Leucocytozoon species L. andrewsi has both vertebrate and insect hosts. The invertebrate hosts belong to the flies of the genus Simulium. The vertebrate hosts for this parasite are chickens.

Description 
The parasite was first described by Atchley in 1951.

Geographical occurrence 
This species is found in the United States of America.

Clinical features and host pathology 
This species infects chickens (Gallus gallus domesticus).

References 

Haemosporida
Poultry diseases
Veterinary protozoology
Parasites of birds
Parasites of Diptera
Simulium